Debes is a surname which may refer to:

 Hans Jákupsson Debes (1723–1769), Prime Minister of the Faroe Islands from 1752 to 1769
 Inge Debes (1882–1945), Norwegian jurist, editor and politician
 Jens Peter Debes (1776–1832), Norwegian judge and politician
 Lothar Debes (1890-1960), German officer in both world wars
 Lucas Debes (1623-1675), Danish priest, topographer and writer
 Peter Olaf Debes (1845–1914), Norwegian politician
 Thierry Debès (born 1974), French retired football goalkeeper